Richard Merrill was a Digital Equipment Corporation employee who invented the FOCAL programming language and programmed the first two interpreters for the language in 1968 and 1969, for the PDP-8.  He also developed later versions of the interpreter for the PDP-7 and PDP-9, later ported it to the PDP-11.

Merrill also designed and programmed the EDIT-8 text editor (using paper-tape).

Rick Merrill is an alumnus of Episcopal High School, a preparatory school in Alexandria, VA and of M.I.T BS'63 MS'65 and Clark University MBA'85

References 

Year of birth missing (living people)
American computer scientists
Digital Equipment Corporation people
Programming language designers
Living people